Hnata Yury is a station on the Kyiv Light Rail. It was opened in 1977.

The station is under the roundabout at Lesya Kurbas, Gnata Yuri, and Volodymyr Pokotyl Street, but is not a full-fledged underground station because it is not fully covered. The station has two shore platforms with separate exits connected by a pedestrian bridge.

History
Closed for reconstruction as part of the route "Ivan Lepse"- "Hnata Yury" on June 13, 2009. During the reconstruction, an arched ceiling was built over the platforms and tracks and the entrance pavilions were renovated, as well as a track connecting the branches from Gnata Yuri to the Kiltseva Doroga station and to Mykhailivska Borshchahivka. On October 16, 2010, the station of high-speed trams was opened after reconstruction, trams of routes № 1 and № 3 stop here.

Gallery

References

External links
 

Kyiv Light Rail stations